Baron Herbert is a title in the Peerage of England. It was created by writ in 1461 for William Herbert, who was later made Earl of Pembroke. The second Earl of Pembroke surrendered his earldom in return for the earldom of Huntingdon, which became extinct on his death without male issue. The barony, however, passed to his daughter Elizabeth, who later married the first Earl of Worcester. At Elizabeth's death, the title passed to her son, who later inherited his father's earldom of Worcester. Later, the fifth Earl was made Marquess of Worcester, and the third Marquess became Duke of Beaufort. Thereafter, the barony and dukedom remained united until 1984 when, upon the death of the tenth Duke without issue, the barony fell into abeyance. Then, in 2002, Queen Elizabeth II terminated the abeyance of the barony of Herbert in favour of the last holder's great-nephew, David John Seyfried.

Barons Herbert (1461)

William Herbert, 1st Earl of Pembroke, 1st Baron Herbert (1423–1469), in 1468 created Earl of Pembroke;
William Herbert, 2nd Earl of Pembroke, 1st Earl of Huntingdon, 2nd Baron Herbert (d. 1491) (son), in 1479 created Earl of Huntingdon;
Elizabeth Herbert, suo jure 3rd Baroness Herbert (c.1476-1509/13) (daughter), wife of Charles Somerset, 1st Earl of Worcester (c.1460-1526), in 1509 summoned to Parliament in right of his wife as Lord Herbert and in 1513 created Earl of Worcester; 
Henry Somerset, 2nd Earl of Worcester, 4th Baron Herbert (c. 1495–1548) (son); 
William Somerset, 3rd Earl of Worcester, 5th Baron Herbert (d. 1589) (son);
Edward Somerset, 4th Earl of Worcester, 6th Baron Herbert (d. 1628) (son);
Henry Somerset, 1st Marquess of Worcester, 5th Earl of Worcester, 7th Baron Herbert (bef. 1590–1646) (son), in 1643 created Marquess of Worcester 
Edward Somerset, 2nd Marquess of Worcester, 8th Baron Herbert (1601–1667)
Henry Somerset, 1st Duke of Beaufort, 9th Baron Herbert (1629–1700)
Henry Somerset, 2nd Duke of Beaufort, 10th Baron Herbert (1684–1714)
Henry Somerset, 3rd Duke of Beaufort, 11th Baron Herbert (1707–1745)
Charles Noel Somerset, 4th Duke of Beaufort, 12th Baron Herbert (1709–1756)
Henry Somerset, 5th Duke of Beaufort, 13th Baron Herbert (1744–1803)
Henry Charles Somerset, 6th Duke of Beaufort, 14th Baron Herbert (1766–1835)
Henry Somerset, 7th Duke of Beaufort, 15th Baron Herbert (1792–1853)
Henry Charles Fitzroy Somerset, 8th Duke of Beaufort, 16th Baron Herbert (1824–1899)
Henry Adelbert Wellington Fitzroy Somerset, 9th Duke of Beaufort, 17th Baron Herbert (1847–1924)
Henry Hugh Arthur Somerset, 10th Duke of Beaufort, 18th Baron Herbert (1900–1984) (abeyant 1984)
David John Seyfried-Herbert, 19th Baron Herbert (b. 1952) (abeyance terminated 2002)

The heir apparent is the present holder's son the Hon. Oliver Richard Seyfried Herbert (b. 1976).
He has one son Oscar James Seyfried Herbert (b. 2004).

References

1461 establishments in England
Baronies in the Peerage of England
Noble titles created in 1461